Louis Gage (June 26, 1928 – April 24, 2014) was an American boxer. He competed in the men's welterweight event at the 1952 Summer Olympics.

References

External links
 

1928 births
2014 deaths
American male boxers
Olympic boxers of the United States
Boxers at the 1952 Summer Olympics
Sportspeople from Lake Charles, Louisiana
Welterweight boxers